Rubigny is a commune in the Ardennes department in northern France.

It is located 60 km north of Reims, at the junction of the D8 and D36 routes. Neighbouring villages are Wadimont and Vaux-lès-Rubigny.

Population

See also
Communes of the Ardennes department

References

Communes of Ardennes (department)